Janet Green (1908–1993) was a British screenwriter and playwright best known for the scripts for the BAFTA nominated films Sapphire  and Victim, and for the play Murder Mistaken (made into the film Cast a Dark Shadow).

Biography
She was born in Hitchin, Hertfordshire on 4 July 1908.

Originally an actress, on stage from 1931, she made appearances in the Aldwych Farces (1930–34) and was involved with entertainment for the armed forces in WW II. She gave up acting in 1945 to focus on writing.

Her second husband was the scriptwriter John McCormick, with whom she collaborated on several screenplays. They were both under contract to the Rank Organisation from 1956–59.

Green wrote and collaborated with her husband on screenplays for three of the "social issue" films of producer Michael Relph and director Basil Dearden: Sapphire (dealing with racial tension in 1950s London), Victim (the first mainstream examination of homosexuality) and Life for Ruth (religious intolerance). They have been described as "three of the finest films in British cinema." Of Sapphire, the New York Post wrote in 1959, "Perhaps the screenplay writer, one Janet Green, deserves her own special notice for a picture that is so special."

She and her husband wrote John Ford's final film 7 Women (1966).

Green died in Beaconsfield on 30 May 1993.

Filmography

Theatre

References

External links

 Janet Green Collection at the British Film Institute (link opens PDF).

1908 births
1993 deaths
People from Hitchin
English dramatists and playwrights
English women dramatists and playwrights
British women screenwriters
20th-century English screenwriters
20th-century English women
20th-century English people